Olga Alekseyevna Zharinova, is a Russian theater and film actress, better known under the pseudonym Olga Bolbukh (Больбух).

Biography
Olga was born in Moscow to a family of teachers: her father is a senior lecturer of mathematics, and her mother is a deputy principal of a Moscow school.
Olga’s artistic talent showed in her early childhood. Her parents were quite upbeat about their daughter’s going to prestigious English language grammar school and a piano school altogether. When a girl, Olga also learnt at and went on Russia-wide tours with the Vdokhnovenie dancing group.
She had just turned 11 when a prominent Russian avant-garde stage director, Vyacheslav Spesivtsev, announced a contest for talented boys and girls for his Moscow Youth Theater in Krasnaya Presnya. Having passed all rounds of the contest, Olga was admitted to the theater. She liked it so much that after a course in theater art and a certain stage experience, she made up her mind to become an actress. However, this time her parents were strongly against the idea. Her father thought that a serious classical education was a must for his daughter. Olga had to obey and joined the National University of Science and Technology, where she majored in higher mathematics, but she insisted that she would continue her association with the Youth Theater.

She earned a Master's degree in mathematics and, having presented her parents with her education certificated they wanted, decided to find her own way.
Olga left Moscow for a tour of the Netherlands with a concert and theater performance in 1991.
A decade later, in 2001, she began as a film actress, having chosen the pseudonym Olga Bolbukh. Her aggressive and creative work put her on the list of Top-10 Russian film actresses in 2007, and the annual magazine Kumiry Rossii even called her the "Russian Monica Bellucci." She has been largely involved in advertising business ever since, working with U.S. pharmaceutical maker Unipharm Inc., world-famous jewelry firm Cartier SA, and international brand Dolce & Gabbana.
After the film Nekrasivaya, released in 2002, Olga’s career in show business developed rapidly. She was invited to play a variety of parts from ‘femme fatale’ in Nekrasivaya to a common village girl in Armeyskiye Istorii aka Borodin. Vozvrashcheniye Generala.

Career highlights

Filmography

Merits and awards

1) In 2007 Olga Bolbukh was awarded the Russian 1000 Faces Award as the best Russian Actress in cinema category.

2) The feature film Borodin.  Vozvrashenie Generala known under the working name of "Armeiskie Istorii" won the Top Prize of the 10th DetectiveFEST show of detective films and security-related TV programs.
The film got immense popularity in Ukraine.

3) TV series: Zona.  Tyuremny Roman was named the most sensational TV project of 2006 in Russia. It was nominated for the prize of the 46th Monte-Carlo Television Festival.

4) Feature film “Slushaya Tishinu” was awarded:
2007 – The Debut Prize of the “Stalker” human rights film festival in Moscow.
2007 – A special jury prize for the best debut at the “Okno V Evropu” film festival in Vyborg.
2007 – A diploma from the jury for the best actor debut at the “Okno V Evropu” film festival in Vyborg.
2007 – A special prize of the jury at the “Moskovskaya Premiera” film festival.

5) Feature film Heat was top-selling in Russia in 2007.

6) TNS/Gallup media called “Zona.  Tyuremny Roman.” TV series one of the most rated products of the Russian popular TV channel NTV.

References

Ruskino
Lifestars
All Stars
Moskv.ru
4 Moscow
Uglich Film Company
Trubnikova
Cinema Actors
Nash Film
ELANCE
Detective Fest
Zona
Lenta.ru
NG

Russian film actresses
National University of Science and Technology MISiS alumni
Living people
Actresses from Moscow
1972 births